Ivailo Gavrilov  (born ) is a former Bulgarian male volleyball player. He was part of the Bulgaria men's national volleyball team at the 1996 Summer Olympics. He played for Olympiacos and Moka Rica Forlì Italy. His father was the former Bulgarian international volleyball player and coach Brunko Iliev.

Clubs
 Slavia (1990)
 Moka Rica Forlì Italy (1994)
 Olympiacos (1996–97)

References

External links
profile at sports-reference.com

1970 births
Living people
Bulgarian men's volleyball players
Olympiacos S.C. players
Place of birth missing (living people)
Volleyball players at the 1996 Summer Olympics
Olympic volleyball players of Bulgaria
PAOK V.C. players